The High School of Commerce is a former secondary school that existed from 1929 until 1990 in Ottawa. The site of the High School of Commerce from 1967 to 1990 is now home to the Adult High School.

History
A commerce program had begun at Ottawa Collegiate Institute in 1902. The program became quite popular, and in 1915 it had to move to temporary quarters at Hopewell Public School. In 1917 it moved to the new Ottawa Technical High School building, but officially remained an OCI program. In 1921 the commerce program was merged with the vocational program and both were administered by Ottawa Tech. Both the technical training and the commerce programs proved quite popular, and in 1929 the commerce program was moved to its own building, attached to the west of Glebe Collegiate Institute, and the High School of Commerce became Ottawa's fourth public high school.

In 1967 the High School of Commerce moved to an even larger and newer facility on Rochester Street. This was considered an extremely modern facility, most notable for having an IBM 1401 computer on the third floor.

Programs
The school offered both a secretarial program and an extensive and intensive art program.

The program was highly respected and afforded an excellent foundation in Fine Art, Textile Design, Theatre Arts, and Commercial and Graphic Arts. Graduates of the 4 year art program moved directly into art or craft programs at colleges and universities such as Mount Allison, The Ontario College of Art, Sheridan College, and Queens University. Most students were able to secure second-year standing on the strength of their experience at the High School of Commerce.
 
However, enrollment in the commercial programs began to steadily decline as most students opted for the composite schools and demographics made for fewer young people. In 1983 part of the building was given to the adult education program. This program gradually grew and in 1990 the High School of Commerce was closed and the Adult High School took over.

The art program transferred to Canterbury High School.

References

Keith, Janet. The Collegiate Institute Board of Ottawa: A Short History, 1843-1969. Ottawa: Kent, 1969.

Commerce
Educational institutions established in 1929
Educational institutions disestablished in 1990
1929 establishments in Ontario
1990 disestablishments in Ontario